Stygobromus arizonensis, the Arizona cave amphipod, is a troglomorphic species of amphipod in family Crangonyctidae. It is endemic to Arizona in the United States.

It is known only from three specimens; two collected at a cave on the Flying "H" Ranch in 1963 and one from a mine near Paradise, Arizona. It has not been collected since then. The main threat to its survival is abstraction of groundwater.

References

Freshwater crustaceans of North America
Crustaceans described in 1974
Cave crustaceans
Endemic fauna of Arizona
arizonensis